Afroza Sultana Ratna (known by her stage name Shabana) is a Bangladeshi film actress. She earned a total of ten Bangladesh National Film Awards. Her national film award-winning roles were in Janani (1977), Sokhi Tumi Kar (1980), Dui Poisar Alta (1982), Nazma (1983), Bhat De (1984), Apeksha (1987), Ranga Bhabi (1989), Moroner Pore (1990) and Achena (1991). Across her three-decade-long career, she appeared in 299 films. She co-starred with Alamgir in 130 of them. In 1981, Shabana attended the 12th Moscow International Film Festival where she met actress Natalya Belokhvostikova. Shabana starred in the film Bhat De for which she received the National Film Award as Best Actress in 1984 and attended the Cannes Film Festival. Shabana served as a UNICEF Goodwill Ambassador and helped with vaccination campaigns against polio in Bangladesh in 1988 and 1989. She was photographed with fellow UNICEF Goodwill Ambassador actress, Audrey Hepburn, in 1989. In July 2017, Shabana was awarded the Lifetime Achievement Award by Prime Minister for her contribution as an actress to the Bangladeshi Film Industry.

Early life and career
Shabana's family has originated in Dabua, Raozan area in Chittagong. She started her acting career co-starring with Pakistani actor Nadeem in Urdu film Chakori in 1967. She acted in 299 films in Bengali and Urdu, and one in Hindi titled Shatru where she starred with Indian actor Rajesh Khanna in 1986. The film was directed by Pramod Chakravorty. She acted with Nadeem, Razzak, Bulbul Ahmed, Prabir Mitra, Shawkat Akbar, Subhash Dutta, Rahman, Syed Hasan Imam, Ujjal, Zafar Iqbal, Alamgir, Jashim, ATM Shamsuzzaman, Khasru, Sohel Rana, Mahmud Koli, Ilyas Kanchan, Wasim (actor), Humayun Faridi, Javed Sheikh and Rajesh Khanna.

Shabana-Nadeem pair
Shabana first acted with Pakistani film actor Nadeem in her debut Urdu film Chakori in 1967. Her performances in the films Anari, Chotey Sahab, Chand aur Chandni and Chand Suraj, an experimental film with the first half devoted to the relationship between Waheed Murad and Rozina and the unconnected second half focused on Shabana and Nadeem, received international critical acclaim.

She resurfaced in Pakistani movies during the 80s, when co-productions among South Asian countries became popular, including roles in Basera (1984) and Aandhi (1991), both co-starring Nadeem. She also starred in the Pakistan-Turkey co-production Halchal with Javed Sheikh in 1986.

Personal life
Shabana retired from acting in 1998 and immigrated to the United States to live with her family members. She has been married to Bangladeshi film producer Wahid Sadique since 1973. They have two daughters and one son. Her daughter graduated from Yale and attended Harvard University for her doctoral work. Her son works in finance.

Filmography

References

External links
 

Living people
1952 births
People from Chittagong
Bangladeshi film actresses
Pakistani film actresses
Actresses in Urdu cinema
Actresses in Hindi cinema
Bangladeshi expatriate actresses in India
Best Actress National Film Awards (Bangladesh) winners
Best Actress Bachsas Award winners
National Film Award (Bangladesh) for Lifetime Achievement recipients
Best Supporting Actress National Film Award (Bangladesh) winners
20th-century Bangladeshi actresses